The Cadillac Commercial Chassis is a chassis that was built by the Cadillac division of General Motors.  Produced from 1931 to 1979, the Commercial Chassis was constructed as an incomplete vehicle intended for use by coachbuilders for final assembly and fitment of bodywork.  Produced on the D platform (exclusive to Cadillac) throughout its entire production, the Commercial Chassis was initially derived from the Series 355, shifting to the Series 75 from 1936 onward.    

Coinciding with a change in design regulations and the downsizing of Cadillac sedans, the Commercial Chassis was phased out as a distinct product line.  The professional car basis would be continued by the Series 75 and successor flagship Cadillac sedans to current production.

Design overview 
The Cadillac Commercial Chassis is a variant of the GM D-body specifically developed for professional car use; most applications included funeral coaches (hearses), ambulances, and combination cars.  In contrast to the Cadillac 75 (a factory-built limousine), the Commercial Chassis was designed with a heavier-duty frame; to improve access to the rear cargo area, the rear frame rails were positioned lower than a standard D-body.   

Produced by Cadillac as an "incomplete vehicle", the rolling chassis was fitted with no bodywork aft of the dashboard. While fitted with all road controls and front body trim (and air conditioning, if specified), all bodywork from the dashboard rearward was completed by coachbuilders using the chassis as a basis for a completed vehicle; to aid body fabrication, front door shells and rear quarter panels were shipped to the coachbuilders (separate from the chassis).  

Before World War II, the Commercial Chassis used the longest wheelbase of any GM sedan-based vehicle, ranging up to 165 inches in 1940.  During the 1950s and 1960s, the chassis used a 156-inch wheelbase, with the 1971-1976 chassis reaching a 157.5-inch length.  The powertrain was shared with the Series 75 through its entire production.

Discontinuation 
In the early 1970s, federal design regulations forced a shift of the donor chassis from commercial car chassis to cutaway van chassis (and light trucks).  Along with wider and taller interiors, design requirements for ambulance bodies effectively forced a change from a wagon-type body to a modular box.  While construction of funeral coaches remained unaffected, a low demand for new vehicles coincided with their long service life.  

For 1977, Cadillac downsized its full-size sedan lines, including the D-body chassis; the Series 75 became offered solely as a limousine; the Commercial Chassis followed suit in downsizing.  The professional car industry underwent a period of struggle, as multiple firms either closed their doors or were reorganized (such as Superior, Miller-Meteor and Hess & Eisenhardt).  The final ambulances of the D-body Commercial Chassis were built in 1979.  

Following the discontinuation of the Cadillac Commercial chassis, the construction of coachbuilt professional cars has remained the same; a rolling chassis is bodied aft of the dashboard.  On an official basis, Cadillac has produced "incomplete"-bodied versions of several of its unibody-chassis product lines, including the DeVille, DTS, XTS, and CT6.  Additionally, the Cadillac Escalade ESV (based on the Chevrolet Suburban) is used for funeral-coach applications. With the closure of the Oshawa assembly plant and subsequent demise of the Cadillac XTS platform, Cadillac is using the XT5 and XT6 SUV chassis for hearses, starting in 2020.

Legacy 
The Cadillac Commercial Chassis is perhaps most famous as the basis for the Ectomobile in the 1984 film Ghostbusters and its sequels, Ghostbusters II (1989) and Ghostbusters: Afterlife (2021).

Sources
"Classic American Ambulances: 1900-1979 Photo Archive," by Walt McCall and Tom McPherson

External links
Cadillac Commercial Chassis database with additional photos
 Cadillac Master Coachbuilders

Commercial Chassis
Rear-wheel-drive vehicles